White Snow, Bright Snow is a 1947 book written by Alvin Tresselt and illustrated by Roger Duvoisin.  Released by Lothrop Publishers, it was the recipient of the Caldecott Medal for illustration in 1948.

Plot summary
At the first snowfall of the year, all the grown-ups do their usual things when a snowstorm comes, while the children are filled with wonder.

References

American picture books
Caldecott Medal–winning works
1947 children's books